El Arco may refer to :

El Arco, Salamanca, a village and municipality in the province of Salamanca, Spain
Arch of Cabo San Lucas, a distinctive rock formation at Cabo San Lucas, Baja California, Mexico